The 2019–20 Saint Joseph's Hawks basketball team represented Saint Joseph's University during the 2019–20 NCAA Division I men's basketball season. The Hawks were led by first-year head coach Billy Lange, They played their home games at Hagan Arena in Philadelphia, Pennsylvania as members of the Atlantic 10 Conference.

St. Joseph's finished the season with a 6–26 record and finished 2–16 in Atlantic 10 play. They entered as the bottom seed in the 2020 Atlantic 10 men's basketball tournament. There, they were eliminated in the first round by George Mason, 70–77.

Previous season
The Hawks finished the 2018–19 season 14–19 overall, 6–12 in A-10 play to finish in a tie for 10th place. As the No. 10 seed in the A-10 tournament, they advanced to the quarterfinals, where they lost to Davidson.

On March 19, 2019, Phil Martelli was fired after 24 seasons as the head coach. He ended his tenure at Saint Joseph's with a 444–328 record. Shortly thereafter, the school hired Philadelphia 76ers assistant coach Billy Lange as head coach.

Offseason

Departures

Incoming transfers

2019 recruiting class

2020 recruiting class

Roster

Schedule and results

|-
!colspan=9 style=| Regular season

|-
!colspan=9 style=| Atlantic 10 tournament

Source

References

Saint Joseph's Hawks men's basketball seasons
Saint Joseph's
Saint Joseph's
Saint Joseph's